Stuart L. Hart is an American academic, writer and theorist and the founder of Enterprise for a Sustainable World, a non-profit dedicated to helping businesses make the transition to sustainability.

A Fortune 100 consultant, Hart is one of the world's leading authorities on the implications of sustainable development and environmentalism relative to business strategy. He is the S.C. Johnson Chair of Sustainable Global Enterprise and Professor of Management at Cornell University's Johnson School of Management; he is also the founder of the school's Center for Sustainable Global Enterprise and the Base of the Pyramid Learning Lab, comprising seven global facilities.

Prof. Hart has taught strategic management and founded both the Center for Sustainable Enterprise (CSE) at the University of North Carolina's Kenan-Flagler Business School, and the Corporate Environmental Management Program (CEMP) at the University of Michigan. Prof. Hart has published over 50 papers and authored or edited five books. In 1997, he wrote the seminal article "Beyond Greening: Strategies for a Sustainable World" which helped launch the movement for corporate sustainability. The article won Harvard Business Review's Mckinsey Award for the best article of the year.

With C.K.Prahalad, Prof. Hart also wrote the 2002 article "The Fortune at the Bottom of the Pyramid", later expanded into a book of the same name. He is author of the book Capitalism at the Crossroads: The Unlimited Business Opportunities in Solving the World's Most Difficult Problems as well as several scholarly articles and publications. According to Bloomberg Businessweek, he is "one of the founding fathers of the "base of the pyramid" economic theory".

Education and career
Hart holds a B.A from University of Rochester, an M.F.S. from the Yale School of Forestry and Environmental Studies, and a Ph.D. from University of Michigan. After graduating from UM, where he founded the Corporate Environmental Management Program, he took a position at the Kenan-Flagler Business School in the University of North Carolina, serving as Hans Zulliger Distinguished Professor of Sustainable Enterprise and Professor of Strategic Management. While there, he founded the Center for Sustainable Global Enterprise and the Base of the Pyramid Learning Laboratory. In 2010, he held the Samuel C. Johnson Chair of Sustainable Global  Enterprise  and Professor of Management at the Johnson School of Management at Cornell University.  

In 2014, Hart joined the Grossman School of Business at the University of Vermont to create a new one-year Sustainable Entrepreneurship MBA.

References

External links
Stuart Hart's official website
Stuart Hart's blog
Enterprise for a Sustainable World
Stuart Hart's academic website
Hart’s Business Educators Member Profile

Living people
American economists
Financial economists
University of Rochester alumni
Place of birth missing (living people)
Year of birth missing (living people)
Yale School of Forestry & Environmental Studies alumni
University of Michigan alumni
Johnson School faculty
University of Vermont faculty